Sunrise Hospital is a tertiary care multi-speciality hospital and prominent laparoscopic center in the city Kochi in the South Indian state of Kerala. It was established in 2005, by Dr. Hafeez Rahman, the Chairman of Sunrise Group of Hospitals. Sunrise Group of Hospitals have branches in United Arab Emirates and India provides consultations .

Overview
The hospital is about 23 km from Cochin international Airport, located in Kakkanad and is accessible through the Seaport-Airport Road. The hospital complex is spread over 1.5 acres with a built-up area of 100,000 sq.ft. Sunrise Hospital has 40 medical departments and specialties with shoulder & upper limb surgery, reproductive medicine, gastroenterology, pulmonology, cardiovascular surgery, autism treatment and other developmental disorders, gynaecology & obstetrics, urology, obesity & diabetic surgery and plastic surgery etc.

Other Services
Sunrise Hospital is engaged in providing community outreach programs in schools, villages and civilian bodies about preventive medicine and healthy lifestyle.

References

External links
Official Website
eClinic Systems
Official Website of Reproductive Medicine/IVF Department
Clinic management software

Hospitals in Kochi
2005 establishments in Kerala
Hospitals established in 2005